Ford Romania is an automobile manufacturing company operated by Ford of Europe, located in Craiova, Romania.

History

20th century
Royal Garage imported Ford cars as early as May 1911. Shortly, other agencies such as Colin & Co., Leonida & Co., Noel S.A.R, and Raf S.A.R. expanded the market. Numerous political figures owned Ford cars. Among them was Ion I. C. Brătianu, whose daughter used to call her car Forduţa. Ford cars were an instant success story, thus between May 1911 and November 1912, Royal Garage already sold 106 Ford cars. On December 8, 1920, Collin & Co. requested on behalf of the Ford Motor Company the permission to build an assembly plant in Romania. Unfortunately, Vintilă Brătianu, “notoriously anti-American”, rejected the proposal to the regret of the people directly involved as well as the public opinion. 

In October 1927, William G. Collins (in the future, assistant manager in Alexandria, Egypt) renewed the proposal for establishing an assembly plant in Constanţa. Finally, in 1931, Ford Motor Company opened a subsidiary in Bucharest. On March 1, 1935 Ford Romania addressed a request for building a new plant on Calea Floreasca, the architect was P. Em. Miclescu, with the contribution of Ioana Golescu. On September 26, 1934, Ford Romania bought 7,535 square meters from Imobiliara Chrissoveloni, at the price of lei 2,335,850 (the price for one square meter was lei 310). Furthermore, Ford Romania intended to receive the advantages granted by the law encouraging the national industry, to sign a treaty for a period of ten years, and to import 2,500 units per year, and the ability to increase this number if the demand would be higher. Lastly, the company requested to be taxed on parts rather than on built-up units. 

On May 6, 1936, the Government reduced the privileges granted to Ford, thus the number of imported units dropped to 100; the names of the parts were individually identified, such as paint, valve oil. On May 15, 1936, the assembly plant situated in Bd. V. Craiu (Calea Floreasca) opened. The capacity of this assembly plant was 2,500 cars per year and different reparations at 6,000 cars yearly, the power, the rough material and the employees: „250 workers, from whom five foreign foremen, five technicians and a Romanian draughtsman. The technical manager was a Romanian engineer (L. D. Greceanu). The administrative management was to be held by a general manager, Austrian citizen, helped by five managers, four Romanian citizens and a Swiss one, who are helped at the office by twelve bookkeepers and twenty-six administrative clerks, five of them foreign citizens”. Ford company came to Romania in 1935, after a negotiation with the Romanian government. The company started the first car production line in Eastern Europe at the Ford Română S.A.R. facility in Floreasca neighborhood of Bucharest. It assembled 1935 Ford (V8-48 and V8-68 models), 1937 Ford (V8-74/78, V8-81A/82A, V8-91A/92A and V8-01A/02A models), in Standard and De Luxe versions, Mercury Eight, and Fordson trucks.

The plant produced until World War II when it did only repair activities for the army vehicle fleet. After the war, in 1948, the company was nationalized, and changed its activity to become, in 1960, Automatica, a manufacturer of electrical equipment and automation.

21st century
In modern times the company is located in Craiova, in the former Oltcit car factory, later Daewoo Motors facility in Romania (as Daewoo Automobile Romania), which Ford acquired in 2008 from the Romanian government.

Vehicle production at the plant began in September 2009 with the Ford Transit Connect, and later with the Ford B-Max. Engine production at the plant includes three- and four-cylinder versions of Ford's EcoBoost engine family. The plant has a production capacity of 300,000 units per year and it is the country's third company by value of exports.

In March 2016, it was announced that the Ford EcoSport will be built at the Craiova plant starting from the autumn of 2017, moving production for the European market from the current plant in Chennai, India. This happens on the background of the growing market for the SUV segment in Europe, and will bring an investment of €200 million to the factory.

In March 2022, it is announced that Ford Otosan is going to purchase the ownership of Ford Romania.

Production

Automobiles

 Ford Transit Connect (2009–2012)
 Ford B-Max (2012–2017)
 Ford EcoSport (2017–present)
 Ford Puma (2019–present)

Engines

 1.0 L EcoBoost I3 (2012–present)
 1.5 L EcoBoost I4 (2013–2014)

See also
Automobile Craiova

References

External links
 

1976 establishments in Romania
Vehicle manufacturing companies established in 1976
Car manufacturers of Romania
Ford of Europe factories
Privatized companies in Romania
Buildings and structures in Craiova
Companies based in Craiova

de:Automobile Craiova